From Nashville with Love  is the twenty-ninth studio album by American guitarist Chet Atkins, released in 1966.

The album peaked at no. 26 on the Billboard country albums chart.

Track listing

Side one 
 "La Fiesta" (Byron Williams)
 "Song from Moulin Rouge (Where Is Your Heart?)" (William Engvick, George Auric, Augene Ageron)
 "Something Tender" (George Barnes)
 "Romance"
 "Drina" (Stanislav Binički)
 "Al Di La" (Carlo Donida, Mogol)

Side two 
 "From Nashville with Love" (John D. Loudermilk)
 "English Leather" (Jerry Hubbard)
 "After the Tears" (Atkins, Shirley Nagel)
 "Stranger on the Shore" (Acker Bilk, Robert Mellin)
 "Soul Journey" (Atkins, Tim Spencer)
 "I Love Paris" (Cole Porter)

Personnel
Chet Atkins – guitar
William K. McElhiney - arranger
Chuck Seitz, Jim Malloy - engineer

References

1966 albums
Chet Atkins albums
Albums produced by Chet Atkins
Albums produced by Bob Ferguson (music)
RCA Victor albums
Albums produced by Anita Kerr